Zarkesh is a province in Tehran, Iran located in District 8. It is a suburb in north-east of Tehran, the country's capital city. It historically has consisted of primarily Armenian population, who are Christians.  It's Coordinates are  35°43'0"N   51°28'40"E.

References 

Populated places in Tehran County